Harold Pemberton Brittan (11 November 1894 – 9 April 1964) was a U.S.-English soccer center forward. He began his career in England with Chelsea before moving to the United States. In the U.S., he was a prolific goalscorer with the powerhouse Bethlehem Steel, Philadelphia Field Club and Fall River Marksmen clubs in the National Association Football League and American Soccer League. He was inducted into the National Soccer Hall of Fame in 1951.

England
Brittan began his professional career with English First Division club Chelsea during the 1913–1914 season. He saw time in only two games, scoring two goals. The next season, his playing time increased to only nine games in which he scored another two goals. When World War I began in 1914, Brittan was called into the British Army, serving three and a half years. In 1919, he rejoined Chelsea for the 1919–1920 season. He still saw limited playing time in only thirteen games, scoring only three goals. However, two of those came as game winners over Liverpool. Chelsea would not take a league double off Liverpool again until 2005. In March 1919, Chelsea loaned him to Leicester Fosse for two games. By the end of the 1919–1920 season, Brittan had become dissatisfied with both playing for Chelsea and life in England. Most of his family had moved to the U.S. where they settled in Philadelphia and Brittan decided to join them. When the management of top U.S. club Bethlehem Steel heard that he was coming to the U.S., they immediately signed him.

United States

Bethlehem Steel
Brittan signed with Bethlehem Steel of the National Association Football League (NAFBL) at the end of the 1919–1920 season, playing only one game, but scoring the lone goal, in a 1–0 victory over Brooklyn Robins Dry Dock.  This was a significant goal in that Bethlehem won the league title by one point over Erie A.A. Brittan found his form as Bethlehem's starting center forward at the beginning of the 1920-1921 NAFBL season. He not only scored at a prolific rate, but assisted on numerous goals. This led to interest in reacquiring Brittan on the part of Chelsea. The Pensioners reputedly offered Bethlehem up $15,000 for his contract.  Bethlehem rebuffed Chelsea and Brittan led the Steel Men to a six-point margin of victory in the league standings. However, the NAFBL was declining by this time and in the summer of 1921, several of the league's stronger teams combined with other regional powerhouses to create the first American Soccer League (ASL).

Philadelphia Field Club
The creation of the ASL led to the brief disestablishment of the Bethlehem Steel team. Edgar and W. Luther Lewis, owners of Bethlehem Steel, decided to move the team to Philadelphia where it would compete under the name Philadelphia Field Club. The reasons for this move remain unknown but some suspect the two brothers wanted to capitalize on the greater population of Philadelphia to provide a financial base for their team.  As a result, Brittan played the 1921-1922 ASL season with Philadelphia. Using the core of the old Bethlehem Steel team, Philadelphia easily won the league title. Brittan also won the league scoring title with 24 (some reports say 27) goals in 17 games. This was despite sitting out seven games over a two-month period after injuring his leg in December 1921. The Lewis brothers' ploy to increase revenue by relocating their team to Philadelphia failed and they were forced to sell several players to cover the team's debts.

Fall River Marksmen
In September 1922, Brittan signed with the Fall River Marksmen after team owner Sam Mark purchased his contract from the Lewis brothers.  When Brittan arrived in Fall River, he was also given coaching duties in addition to his playing responsibilities. Mark was not disappointed with this move as Brittan would go on to score 135 goals in 168 league games between 1922 and 1926, with a brief return in 1927–1928. Building on Brittan's goal production and coaching, the Marksmen won the league title in 1924, 1925 and 1926. They also won the 1924 National Challenge Cup.

New Bedford Whalers
In August 1926, Fall River surprisingly released Brittan.  He quickly signed with the New Bedford Whalers as a player-coach, but retired a few months later when the Whalers sold his contract to the Providence Clamdiggers.  Apparently, Brittan had become a successful local businessman, owning an automobile dealership, and did not want to move to Providence.

Fall River Marksmen
In the Spring of 1927, Brittan decided to return to the field, this time back with the Fall River Marksmen. While the Marksmen finished third in the league, they won the 1927 National Challenge Cup, defeating Detroit Holley Carburetor F.C. by a score of 7–0. Brittan scored one goal in that victory.  Brittan then played one last complete season with the Marksmen, scoring 16 goals in 28 games, giving him his team record 135 goals in 168 league games during two stints in Fall River.

Team owner
Brittan permanently retired after the 1927–28 season and devoted himself to his business interests. By 1931, the twin depredations of the Great Depression and the U.S. Soccer Wars had taken their tolls on the American Soccer League. Several teams were folding and others were relocating in attempts to maintain their financial solvency. Sam Mark had moved the Marksmen to New York City. In response, Brittan led a group of local businessmen who purchased the Providence Gold Bugs and moved the team to Fall River,   renaming it Fall River F.C. The team failed a few months later.  This was Brittan's last foray into the sport which had played such a large part in his life.

Brittan was inducted into the National Soccer Hall of Fame in 1951.

References

External links
 1913-1914 Chelsea stats
 1914-1915 Chelsea stats
 1919-1920 Chelsea stats* 
 
 National Soccer Hall of Fame profile

1894 births
1964 deaths
Footballers from Derby
English footballers
English emigrants to the United States
Association football forwards
Chelsea F.C. players
Leicester City F.C. players
American soccer players
National Association Football League players
Bethlehem Steel F.C. (1907–1930) players
American Soccer League (1921–1933) players
Philadelphia Field Club players
Fall River Marksmen players
New Bedford Whalers players
American soccer coaches
American soccer chairmen and investors
National Soccer Hall of Fame members
English expatriate sportspeople in the United States
Expatriate soccer players in the United States
English expatriate footballers
English expatriate football managers
Expatriate soccer managers in the United States
American Soccer League (1921–1933) coaches
British Army personnel of World War I